Florencio is a horse that won the 2004 World Championships for Young Dressage Horses in the five-year-old division. He was the only horse to receive a mark of "10" in the 2004 competition, and he received the highest marks total ever given to a combination at the World Championship for Young Horses. He stands 16.2 hh (1.68m) and is in the following stud books: Westfalen, Oldenburg, NRPS, Hannover, AES, Sweden. His current rider is Hans Peter Minderhoud (The Netherlands).

As a foal, Florencio was bought from Frank Van Dijck of Belgium, by Eugene Reesink. Henk Nijhoff partnered in the young stallion, and Florencio was sent into training as a dressage horse with rider Simon Dropp. With Dropp, he was Reserve Champion of Germany in the prestigious 2003 "Bundeschampionaat" and was Overall Champion of the 4-year-olds in Westphalia.

Minderhoud took Florencio as a comunt in 2004. He also began his breeding career during this time. By 2004, he had covered more than 500 mares across Europe, mostly through artificial insemination provided by the Kathmann Stud in Vechta, Germany.

Florencio will now begin training for the FEI levels.

In 2005, Florencio came back EVA (Equine Viral Arteritis) positive. The sexually transmitted disease can cause abortion in mares and illness or sudden death in foals, and therefore his semen is not allowed to be imported into certain countries, such as the United Kingdom. However, Florencio is now undergoing a revolutionary treatment. He will still be safe to breed to EVA-positive mares, of which there are many in the Netherlands.

Testing Scores

Performance Test
Florencio's performance test was held in Zweibrücken, where he finished second:

 Character: 8.5
 Walk: 10
 Trot: 8.2
 Canter: 9.2
 "Rittigkeit" (Rideability): 9.5
 Jumping 7.8.

Scores for the 2004 World Championships for Young Dressage Horses
 First Round: 9.66
 Walk: 9.5
 Trot: 9.8
 Canter: 9.8
 Finals:
 Walk: 9.8
 Trot: 9.7
 Canter: 10*

Florencio's canter was especially notable, being extremely uphill and engaged. However, all three gaits were very impressive. The stallion was said to be very supple, elastic, and through during the Championship.

Florencio is one of only two horses to have ever received a mark of "10" at the World Championships for Young Horses. The other was the stellar mare, Poetin, who received a 10 for her trot at the 2003 Championships, when she competed as a 6-year-old.

Scores for the 2005 World Championships for Young Dressage Horses 
 Friday Qualifier Total: 9.38
 Walk: 9.00
 Trot: 9.60
 Canter: 9.70
 Overall: 9.48
 Trot: 9.8
 Canter: 10

The stallion again had an impressive qualifier test at the 2005 World Championships, winning it yet again. The judges commented on his elasticity, suppleness, and engagement. His trot was bouncy, and his collected and extended walk work was considered excellent. The only negative comment was of the young horse's tendency to sometimes let a little of his tongue hang out.

His test at the final was also excellent, where he won the six-year-old division. The judges commented on his bouncy trot "like a rubber ball", his regular and even walk, and his excellent canter that again earned him a 10. However, the bay stallion lost points due to a medium trot that was not quite in rhythm, a too-large walk pirouette, and the flying changes that would cause the canter to become unbalanced after they were performed.

External links
 Video Clip of Florincio
 Florencio's Pedigree

Dressage horses
1999 animal births